A list of men and women international rugby league matches played throughout 2021 and does not include wheelchair rugby league international matches. A † denotes a recognised, but unofficial match that did not contribute to the IRL World Rankings.

Due to the COVID-19 pandemic, the European Championship B, European Championship C, European Championship D and Americas Championship were all initially postponed until 2021, however all were eventually abanonded except for the European Championship B and European Championship D due to travel restrictions.

2021 Rugby League World Cup was also postponed until 2022 due to Australia and New Zealand pulling out months before the tournament was scheduled to commence.

Season overview

Rankings

The following were the rankings at the beginning of the season.

February

Brazil vs Uruguay men in Australia

March

Peru vs El Salvador men in Australia

June

Serbia men tour of the Balkans

Brazil vs Philippines men in Australia

Wales women in England

October

Netherlands men in Germany

European Championship B

European Championship D

Ireland women in Wales

England women in France

England men in France

Jamaica vs Scotland men in England

December

North Macedonia vs Vietnam men in Australia

Non-IRL international matches

Notes:
 This match was a curtain raiser to an NRL fixture between the Sydney Roosters and the St. George Illawarra Dragons.

Youth test matches

See also
 Impact of the COVID-19 pandemic on rugby league

References 

2021 in rugby league